Freshmen was an American pornographic magazine published monthly by Specialty Publications, a division of LPI Media from 1982 to 2009. The magazine was geared toward gay men, and featured nude photos of men, 18–25 years old. The magazine was soft core, and distributed to mainstream news outlets, and to the soft core sections of adult stores. It was available in all Ruben Sturmen influenced outlets, probably due to the Flynt Distributing connection. It was distributed by Flynt Distributing, of the Larry Flynt empire. The magazine was an attempt to do a gay version of Hustler magazine. Its first editions featured all color photography with very high production values similar in style to Hustler. It also regularly featured male models with erections and exposed anuses, which set this magazine apart from competitors when it first appeared. It was published in a 10-issue per calendar year format, to accommodate the Flynt Distributing model, which put the current month publication on the stands with a next month date. After 2000, the focus was on top-line male porn models from Bel Ami, Falcon and other adult-video production companies. Other items, such as calendars, were also published using the same label.

The magazine contained nude male photography, erotic fiction, video reviews and other gay adult features. The magazine specialized in young but not solely twinkish men, primarily age 18 to 25 but some to age 30. Specialty Publications also published Men magazine, which was in the same format but showed men aged 25 to 40.

In late 2009, Freshmen ceased publication. At first, its active subscriptions were transferred to Unzipped magazine, which itself folded, too, shortly after.

Freshman of the Year
The magazine held an annual contest in which subscribers could vote for their favorite "freshman" of the year. Many fledgling porn stars were featured here, and some, such as Roman Heart (2006), Sebastian Bonnet (2004), Marcus Allen (2003), and Billy Brandt (2002) have gone on to greater success.

1994 – Lucas Ridgeston
1995 – Deny Kolos
2000 – Jeremy Tucker
2001 – Dick McKay
2003 – Marcus Allen
2004 – Sebastian Bonnet
2005 – Josh Elliot 
2006 – Roman Heart
2007 – Zack Randall
2008 – Mario Cazzo
2009 – Zach Randall

References

https://web.archive.org/web/20071106043057/http://zoom.gay.com/viewArticle.do?id=979&selectedRegionId=7&selectedCountryId=12&selectedStateId=&selectedCityId=
http://www.tlavideo.com/product/2-1120-250983_freshmen-magazine-2008-calendar.html?sn=446

LGBT-related magazines published in the United States
Monthly magazines published in the United States
Pornographic magazines published in the United States
Defunct magazines published in the United States
Gay male pornography in the United States
Gay male pornographic magazines
Magazines established in 1982
Magazines disestablished in 2009
1982 establishments in the United States